MB Holding Company LLC is an Omani conglomerate with interests in oil and gas exploration and production, oilfield services, engineering and mining.

The company was founded in 1982 by Mohammed Al Barwani as an oilfield service provider to oil producers such as Petroleum Development Oman and Occidental Petroleum. It subsequently expanded into exploration and production and gained concessions in Oman, Egypt and Mozambique.

MB's engineering arm is involved in the aerospace and defense industry. Its mining subsidiary, Mawarid Mining, was set up in 2000 and is the largest private mining company in Oman. Mawarid is the first private mining company to engage in copper and gold exploration in Oman.

Musstir, the property development arm, specialises in the development of hotels. MB acquired Oceanco, a luxury yacht builder based in the Netherlands, in 2010.

Its other investments include Nautilus Minerals (28 percent), an underwater mineral exploration company based in Canada, Al Madina Takaful (26 percent), an Omani takaful operator, and Watania (51 percent), a takaful operator based in Abu Dhabi.

Al Barwani is chairman of the MB Group while his sons head the mining and oil and gas E&P arms.

Operations
MB Holding's key business segments and operating subsidiaries are as follows:
 Oilfield services: MB Petroleum Services
 Oil and gas exploration and production: Petrogas E&P
 Mining: Mawarid Mining
 Engineering: United Engineering Services

References

External links
 

Companies of Oman
Conglomerate companies established in 1982
Companies based in Muscat, Oman
1982 establishments in Oman